USS Yaupon (ATA-218) was an  of the United States Navy built near the end of World War II. The ship was commissioned on 10 March 1945. Yaupon had a brief naval career, and was decommissioned on 26 March 1946.

Construction 
Originally planned as the  Yaupon (YN-72), the vessel was laid down as an auxiliary net laying ship (AN-72) on 29 January 1944 at Slidell, Louisiana by the Canulette Shipbuilding Company. She was launched on 16 September 1944. The name cancellation was not implemented and she was commissioned on 10 March 1945 as Yaupon.

Career 
Yaupon had a brief navy career. After initial trials and training, during which she allided with an abutment of the bascule bridge at Corpus Christi, Texas, she made one round trip to the Far East. On 27 May 1945, with civilian tug Miraflores, she refloated the tanker Cities Service Fuel, which had gone aground off Galveston. She commenced her first service voyage on 1 June, towing a barge from Westwego, Louisiana for San Diego, California. From there, with another barge, she sailed to Honolulu, Hawaii and thence with a barge and a small tug to Kwajalein Atoll, Marshall Islands and a floating workshop to Buckner Bay, Okinawa, arriving there soon after the Japanese surrender.
 
In January 1946, Yaupon was sent to San Francisco to prepare for decommissioning, which took place on 26 March. Her name was struck from the Navy List on 17 April 1946, and she was sold through the War Shipping Administration on 3 January 1947, probably for demolition.

References 

 

ATA-214-class tugs
Ships built in Slidell, Louisiana
1944 ships
World War II auxiliary ships of the United States